The Graveyard Seamounts, officially known as the Graveyard Knolls, are a series of 28 small seamounts (underwater volcanoes) and edifices located on the Chatham Rise, east of New Zealand. They are named after various morose figures following the naming of the largest of the knolls as "the Graveyard" as it was a graveyard of fishing gear that became stuck on it. The most prominent among the group of knolls are Ghoul, Diabolical, Voodoo, Scroll, Hartless, Pyre, Gothic, Zombie, Mummy, Headstone, Morgue and Graveyard (ordered roughly by increasing size).

Geography and geology 
While the official name for these features refers to knolls, researchers in different disciplines see these features in different terms.

The seamounts are the site of volcanism from the late Cenozoic era.

Ecology 
The Graveyard Knolls is a home to over 50 species of fish, dominated by the orange roughy (Hoplostethus atlanticus), black oreo (Allocyttus niger), and cardinalfish (Apogonidae). Orange roughy in particular aggregate on the Graveyard Knolls for spawning and their visits here have supported a commercial fishery since the mid-1990s. A number of the seamounts are also home to extensive deep water coral forests, made up of Solenosmilia variabilis and Madrepora oculata, both species not known to be of wide extent near New Zealand until camera surveys of Graveyard Knolls in 2001 revealed their extent. These forests offer a home to a diverse invertebrate community that includes squat lobsters, seastars, brittlestars, polychaete worms, and crabs. In contrast, the knolls in the group that are affected by bottom trawling are mostly barren, with few coral and a completely different ecosystem.

In 2001, witnessing the damage of bottom trawling to seamount communities, 19 seamounts off the coast of New Zealand were closed off to bottom trawling, three of them from the Graveyard group. Timed surveys of the seamounts over the years are being used to examine how well a seamount coral community recovers from the effects of dredging over time.

See also 
 Jasper Seamount
 Mud volcano
 Muirfield Seamount
 Sedlo Seamount
 South Chamorro Seamount

References 

Seamounts of New Zealand
Zealandia
Former islands from the last glacial maximum
Volcanoes of New Zealand